The 1986 Nippon Professional Baseball season was the 37th season of operation for the league.

Regular season standings

Central League

Pacific League

Japan Series

Seibu Lions won the series 4–3–1.

See also
1986 Major League Baseball season

References

1986 in baseball
1986 in Japanese sport